Leonore Harris (July 28, 1879 – September 27, 1953) was an American stage and screen actress. She appeared in a handful of silent films and preferred the Broadway stage. As a young woman she was one of many young actresses appearing on cigarette packages by Philip Morris.

Filmography
Betty of Greystone (1916)
Human Driftwood (1916)
The Decoy (1916) (copy: Library of Congress-LoC, BFI Natl. Film & TV)
Friday the 13th (1916)
The Iron Heart (1917)
To-Day (1917)
The Faithless Sex (1922)(*a rerelease of 1916 film The Decoy)

References

External links

Leonore Harris portrait gallery(NY Public Library, Billy Rose collection)
Mount Hebron Cemetery resting place of Leonore Harris
Leonore Harris as a young woman on cigarette pack by Philip Morris
Leonore Harris on left with actress Carroll McComas on the liner RMS Berengaria (retrieved from Wayback Machine)

1879 births
1953 deaths
Actresses from New York City
20th-century American actresses